Aida Yuriyivna Nikolaychuk (born 3 March 1982) is a Ukrainian pop singer and model, who was the winner of the third season of Ukraine's X-Factor TV talent competition in 2012. 

She drew special attention during the show's second season when judges interrupted her performance of Polina Gagarina's Lullaby (Колыбельная, Kalybelnaya), suspecting that she was lip syncing to a recording, and asked her to sing a cappella. Although visibly surprised, Nikolaychuk sang the song equally well without accompaniment.

In 2013, she released her first single, "On Your Planet", which was included in her debut album We're Under One Sky.

Early life
Nikolaychuk was born on 3 March 1982 in Odessa, Ukrainian SSR, Soviet Union, to Irina Leonidivna Munika (formerly Potolova) and computer specialist Yurij Evgenijovich Titaev. When she was ten, her parents got a divorce. She started singing in the first grade, when she became the school choir soloist, and later on performed at school as a hip hop backup singer until 2002, and in her school choir in the fifth and eighth grades.

Music career

2011–2013: X-Factor and widespread attention 
In 2011, Nikolaychuk participated in the casting show for the second season of the Ukrainian television show X-Factor, quitting her job as a cashier to enable her participation in the show. After a unanimous decision by the show's judges to accept her, she proceeded to the training portion of the show.

After Nikolaychuk's retirement from X-Factor, the video of her performance at the casting show reached a record number of views on YouTube. Nikolaychuk then decided to proceed with her participation in X-Factor. She participated in the second season of X-Factor Online. In November 2011, she was announced as a weekly winner of X-Factor Online, and on 31 December 2011, she was announced as the winner of the X-Factor Online second season. By winning X-Factor Online, Nikolaychuk gained entry to the training section of the show for the third season, bypassing the audition and pre-screening stages.

In 2012, Nikolaychuk was invited to performances in Moscow and Berlin. On 10 October 2012, she was interviewed by IMKA TV.

Participating in the third season of X-Factor, Nikolaychuk got to twenty-fourth place in the training section of the show in the 25-years and older category. Her category mentor was Igor Kondratyuk. Nikolaychuk then sang for judges including German singer Thomas Anders. After the visiting judge's performance, Nikolaychuk was placed in the top rankings for her category, and as one of the twelve top finalists. Also in her category were Eugene Litvinkovich and James Golovko. She then entered the direct elimination rounds, in which a contestant on the show is eliminated weekly by judges' vote. Nikolaychuk was never selected for elimination. On 22 December 2012, she participated in the final show. Her rivals were Aleksey Smirnov and Evgeny Litvinkovych. On 29 December 2012, she was chosen as a superfinalist and Alexey Smirnov was eliminated from the show. On 5 January 2013, at the Gala concert, Nikolaychuk was announced the winner of the third season of X-Factor.

On 6 March 2013, the news website Segodnya listed the most-viewed videos of Ukrainian female singers. Nikolaychuk's video, with millions of views, took 5th place.

In May 2013, Nikolaychuk visited Berlin. While there, she participated in photo shoots and spoke at a restaurant, "Peterhof".

2013–2014: My Pod Odnim Nebom 
After winning the third season of X-Factor, Nikolaychuk started working with artists in the Commonwealth of Independent States (CIS) countries, and signed a contract with Sony Music. At the end of May 2013, she presented her debut single and music video, "On Your Planet", released 27 May. On 31 May 2013, she held her first solo concert in her hometown, Odessa.

On 8 June 2013, Nikolaychuk acted as a visiting judge for Mini-Miss Ukraine 2013.

Nikolaychuk currently performs in concerts and appearances in Ukraine.

On 4 September 2013, Nikolaychuk participated in the competition "Promotion", organized by the Russian television channel Music Box, presenting her debut video, and was selected as a winner.

On 4 October 2013, Nikolaychuk performed at Little Miss World 2013 in Bulgaria.

On 24 October 2013, she had her second solo concert in Dnepropetrovsk and visited the local tabloid newspaper, "Komsomolskaya Pravda".

On 14 December 2013, the first Aida solo album "My Pod Odnim Nebom" was released.

On 16 December 2013, the names of nominees for the annual music award YUNA-2013 were released; Aida was nominated for "Discovery of the Year".

In the results of the national poll «Favorites of Success – 2013», Aida was recognized as "Female Singer of the Year" due to the amazing support of her fans.

2015–2018: Looking for a new creative path 
At the end of summer in 2014 the contract with Sony Music was canceled and then started to work with new team. On 29 September 2014 was released a new song called "Muzika" , this marked as a new music era for Aida Nikolaychuk. On 2 December 2014 Aida was represented new song "Dva neba".

She was announced as a participant of the National Final to select the entrant for Ukraine in the Eurovision Song Contest 2016. Aida represented her single for selection called "Inner Power", that also has a Russian version called "Ver'".

Later that year Aida represented new song "Ne trimay" and music video to this song was directed by Dmitriy Peretrutov. 

In 2017 Aida came to Tokyo to participate in the Mozart-show competition for the second time. She performed the Japanese song "Sea of tears" and won the battle with famous Japanese singer Saya Asakura 朝倉さや. In the Final of the show she was defeated with only basis point needed.

2019-present: AIDA  – new chapter 

After a long career pause, on 4 September 2019 - Aida released new single "Red Moon". 

Aida Nikolaychuk is entering a new phase and takes new stage name – AIDA. She already started from new single called "Je T’aime J’adore", that has two versions (Ukrainian and English).

Discography

Singles performed on X-Factor

Singles

Music videos
 "Na tvoey planete" (2013)
 "Ne obeschay" (2013)
 "Korotkie Gudki" (2015)

References

1982 births
Living people
21st-century Ukrainian women singers
Ukrainian folk singers
Musicians from Odesa
Ukrainian pop singers
The X Factor winners
Models from Odesa